Altagonum papuense is a species of ground beetle in the subfamily Carabinae. It was described by Sloane in 1890.

References

Further reading

papuense
Beetles described in 1890